The Russian Game is a 2007 Russian comedy film directed by Pavel Chukhray.

Plot 
The film tells about the Italian card cheater Lukino Forza, whom his creditors found and forced to sign a mortgage on everything he possesses. He was given a week during which he must collect debts, otherwise he will go to jail, and he decides to go to Russia, where he plans to use his talents.

Cast 
 Sergey Makovetskiy
 Sergey Garmash
 Andrey Merzlikin
 Giuliano Di Capua
 Dmitriy Vysotskiy
 Avangard Leontev
 Ignat Akrachkov
 Yuriy Maslak

References

External links 
 

2007 films
2000s Russian-language films
Russian comedy films
2007 comedy films
Films scored by Yuri Poteyenko